Sault Ste. Marie is a cross-border region in Canada and the United States.

Sault Ste. Marie may also refer to:

Places 
 Sault Ste. Marie, Ontario, Canada
 Sault Ste. Marie, Michigan, United States
 Sault Ste. Marie (electoral district), a Canadian federal electoral district
 Sault Ste. Marie (provincial electoral district)

Other uses 
 , a ship of the Royal Canadian Navy